Witold Cichy (born March 15, 1986 in Wodzisław Śląski) is a Polish footballer (defender) who plays for Kolejarz Stróże.

External links
 

1986 births
Living people
Polish footballers
Odra Wodzisław Śląski players
Kolejarz Stróże players
People from Wodzisław Śląski
Sportspeople from Silesian Voivodeship
Association football defenders